Contrast is a five-song EP and the first release from the Tennessee-based band The Features following their departure from Universal Records. The band released the EP on their own on October 25, 2006 via their website and then later via traditional music outlets.  This is also the first release to feature new keyboardist Mark Bond (formerly of Murfreesboro band De Novo Dahl) following the departure of Parrish Yaw.

Track listing

Personnel

The Features
Matt Pelham – vocals, guitar
Rollum Haas – drums
Roger Dabbs – bass
Mark Bond – keyboards

Additional musicians
Chris Carmichael – strings on "I Will Wander"
Deanna Varagona – Bari Sax on "Wooden Heart"

Technical personnel
Jacquire King – production, recording, mixing
J.D. Andrew – recording
Joshua Hood – recording assistant
John Stinson – recording assistant
The Features – art direction, photography

External links

2006 EPs
The Features EPs
Albums produced by Jacquire King